Uruguay transfer windows was opened in summer break after the Apertura season, and before the Apertura

International transfers

Apertura
In
 Mauricio Victorino from Veracruz to Nacional
 Martín Ligüera from Alianza Lima to Nacional
 Diego Perrone from Olimpia Asunción to Nacional
 Oscar Javier Morales from Málaga CF to Nacional
 Richard Morales from Málaga CF to Nacional
 Derlis Florentín from Palmeiras to Nacional
Out
 Fernando Muslera from Nacional to S.S. Lazio
 Diego Godín from Nacional to Villarreal CF
 Walter Gargano from Danubio to Napoli
 Álvaro González from Defensor to Boca Juniors
 Maxi Pereira from Defensor to S.L. Benfica
 Egidio Arévalo from C.A. Peñarol to CF Monterrey
 Ignacio Ithurralde from Defensor to CF Monterrey
 Pablo Pallante from Cerro to Grosseto
 Leonardo Celiz from CA Bella Vista to Deportivo Coreano
 Carlos Adrián Valdez from Nacional to Reggina Calcio

Clausura
In
 Fabián Estoyanoff from Valencia CF to C.A. Peñarol
 Rubén Olivera from Juventus F.C. to C.A. Peñarol
 Carlos Bueno from Boca Juniors to C.A. Peñarol
 Sergio Blanco from Shanghai Shenhua to Nacional

Out
 Williams Martínez from Defensor Sporting to Valenciennes FC
 Richard Porta from River Plate to A.C. Siena
 Christian Stuani from Danubio to Reggina
 Matías Masiero from Central Español to Genoa
 Juan Guillermo Castillo from Peñarol to Botafogo
 Martín Rodriguez from River Plate to Banfield
 Ignacio María González from Danubio to AS Monaco
 Sebastián Rosano from  Montevideo Wanderers to Cagliari
 Pablo Munhoz from Nacional to Wuhan Guanggu

Football Transfers
Uruguay